Thomas C. Burke House is an historic home located in downtown Macon, Georgia at 1085 Georgia Avenue. It is also known as Burke Mansion was designed in 1887 by architect DB Woodruff and remodeled in 1917 by architect Neel Reid. It is listed on the National Register of Historic Places.

Details

It is a Victorian house sitting among a row of Greek Revival mansions. It has a series of gables and chimneys, and a round tower topped with a wrought iron finial and skirted with a porch. It features stained glass and terra cotta trim typical of Queen Ann style architecture, and has been called "one of the finest Queen Anne type houses anywhere in the
country." There is a carriage house to the rear of the main house.

Thomas C. Burke, builder of the house had a successful builder supply business. He finished the interior of his house with the finest of fixtures, hardware and woods. Shortly before World War I the Burke family employed architect Neel Reid to update the interior of their home, and he selected many furnishings from Europe. Mr. Burkes daughters the Misses Mary and Martina Burke, established the T.C. Burke Foundation, which has been invaluable aid to terminally ill cancer patients. The Misses Burke occupied the mansion until their deaths in 1964 and 1965.

The mansion was used as antique shop at one point, and is currently a bed and breakfast. It was listed on the National Register of Historic Places in 1971.

References

External links
 Burke Mansion

Houses on the National Register of Historic Places in Georgia (U.S. state)
National Register of Historic Places in Bibb County, Georgia